Henry Wehrmann was an American engraver of the 19th century. With his wife, he became a successful engraver in the South in the early 1850s and during the American Civil War. He also published a collection of Louisiana Creole songs.

Notes

References

 

American engravers
Year of death missing
Year of birth missing